Melveena Christine McKendrick, FBA (born 23 March 1941) is a retired Welsh academic. She was Professor of Spanish Golden Age Literature, Culture and Society at the University of Cambridge from 1999 to 2008, and served as its Pro-Vice-Chancellor for Education from January 2004 to October 2008. She has also been a Fellow of Girton College, Cambridge since 1967; she is currently a life fellow having retired from full-time academia in 2008.

Early life
She attended Neath Grammar School for Girls.

Personal life
In 1967, the then Melveena Jones married Neil McKendrick. Together they have two daughters.

Honours
In 1999, McKendrick was elected a Fellow of the British Academy (FBA), the United Kingdom's national academy for the humanities and social sciences. In 2013, she was awarded an honorary Doctor of Literature (DLitt) degree by the University of South Wales "in recognition of her outstanding contribution to literature and the arts".

Selected works

References

1941 births
Living people
British Hispanists
British women academics
Fellows of Girton College, Cambridge
Fellows of the British Academy
Historians of Spanish literature
Literary critics of Spanish
People from Neath
Welsh scholars and academics
British women anthropologists